Baltic Yachts is a shipyard specialized in sailing yachts. It is located in the municipality of Larsmo in Finland, where it is the largest employer.
Advanced and light materials, such as carbon fiber and Kevlar are used in the construction.

Boats
Boats produced include:

Baltic 33
Baltic 35
Baltic 37
Baltic 38 DP
Baltic 39
Baltic 40
Baltic 42
Baltic 42 DP
Baltic 43
Baltic 46
Baltic 47
Baltic 48 DP
Baltic 50
Baltic 51
Baltic 52
Baltic 55 DP
Baltic 58
Baltic 64
Baltic 66
Baltic 73
Baltic 142

See also
 List of sailboat designers and manufacturers
 List of large sailing yachts

References

External links
 Baltic Yachts website
 Velejarei - Velejarei | Baltic 175 Pink Gin, o maior sloop de carbono do mundo

Baltic Yachts